Choomphol Chaiyanitr (born 22 March 1922) is a Thai former sports shooter. He competed at the 1964 Summer Olympics and the 1968 Summer Olympics.

References

External links
 

1922 births
Possibly living people
Choomphol Chaiyanitr
Choomphol Chaiyanitr
Shooters at the 1964 Summer Olympics
Shooters at the 1968 Summer Olympics
Choomphol Chaiyanitr
Choomphol Chaiyanitr